Bitter Jester is a documentary film starring Maija DiGiorgio, Kenny Simmons, Jody Del Giorno, and Heather McConnell. The film includes interviews with comedians, Richard Pryor and Richard Belzer, among others.

Synopsis
Maija DiGiorgio is a naive New York comic whose therapist recommends a video diary as a means of examining herself. Maija's borderline psychotic ex-boxer boyfriend, Kenny Simmons, and director of photography, Jody Del Giorno see a means to instant stardom.

Maija, searching to find answers to the meaning of life and art, the answers for art and artifice, allows Kenny to impose his "vision" onto her film. Before long, the three (along with a crew of misfits) are crisscrossing the country, interviewing celebrities under a parade of false pretenses. In one famous incident, Kenny makes the cover of The New York Post after a confrontation with Jerry Seinfeld.

Critical reception 
Dennis Harris of Variety said, "making a movie without really knowing what it's going to be about is not generally advisable, but Maija Di Giorgio's 'Bitter Jester' makes that process quite entertaining." Harris hailed "Jester" as "often hilarious and always diverting" and noted "Di Giorgio may fret that 'Maybe comedy isn't the thing I should be pursuing.' Regardless, she definitely has a future as a filmmaker."

Steve Rhodes of the Online Film Critics Society praised "Bitter Jester is much funnier and more insightful than a similar documentary, Comedian", while MetroActiv described it as "Intense, disturbing, and voyeuristic, the documentary about stand up that's not afraid to jump right into the muck." Bitter Jester had a director's cut, simply titled Hollywood Outlaw Movie.*

Celebrity appearances

Joy Behar
Richard Belzer
Peter Boyle
George Carlin
Chevy Chase
Norm Crosby
Phyllis Diller
Whoopi Goldberg
Gilbert Gottfried
D.L. Hughley
Dom Irrera
Kevin James
Terry Jones
Richard Kind
Kathy Kinney
Robert Klein
Barry Manilow
Colin Mochrie
Paul Mooney
Richard Pryor
Colin Quinn
Tony Roberts
Ray Romano
Rita Rudner
Vincent Schiavelli
George Schlatter
Paul Shaffer
Ryan Stiles
Jerry Stiller
Nicole Sullivan
Judy Tenuta
Rich Vos

References

External links

2003 films
American documentary films
American independent films
2003 documentary films
2003 independent films
Films scored by Joe Delia
2000s English-language films
2000s American films